The men's team tournament of the 2019 European Table Tennis Championships was held from 3 to 8 September 2019.

Germany defeated Portugal in the final to capture the gold medal.

Preliminary round
The top team of each group advances.

Group A

Group B

Group C

Group D

Group E

Group F

Group G

Group H

Knockout stage
All times are local (UTC+2).

Quarterfinals

Semifinals

Final

References

External links
Official website
ITTF website
ETTU website 

Men's team